Podgorač is a municipality in Osijek-Baranja County, Croatia. There are 2,877 inhabitants in the municipality, 81% of whom are Croats and 16.20% Serbs (2011 census).

References

Municipalities of Croatia